Elie Saab (born 4 July 1964) is a Lebanese fashion designer.

His main workshop is in Lebanon, with additional workshops in Milan and Paris. He started his business in the early 1980s and specialised in bridal couture (expensive fabrics, lace, gemstones, Swarovski crystals, pearls, detailed embroidery, etc.).

He is the first Lebanese to be admitted to the fashion industry's governing body, Chambre Syndicale de la Haute Couture. Saab appeared as a judge on Project Runway: Middle East in 2016. As of March 2017, his couture collections are available in Paris, London, and Beirut, while his ready-to-wear clothes were in 160 retailers and his own boutiques. Kate Middleton wore a Saab gown to the Royal Ascot in 2019, marking the first occasion where Saab has dressed a British royal family member.

Early life
Elie Saab is the eldest son of a wood merchant who raised five children in Damour, a southern coastal suburb in Beirut, Lebanon.

Born to Maronite Catholic Lebanese parents in Beirut, Saab began sewing as a child. At the age of eight, his attention had turned to fashion. With his sisters serving as models, he would cut patterns out of newspaper and search his mother's closet for materials.

Career

Early years in fashion
In 1981, Saab moved to Paris to study fashion. He later dropped out to return to Beirut and open his fashion label. In 1982, when he was 18 years old, he worked with a team of 15 employees. At first his atelier specialized in bridal couture, making wedding dresses and gowns using expensive fabrics, lace, detailed embroidery, pearls, crystals and silk threads. In Beirut his reputation grew from dressing women in his neighborhood, and was soon enhanced by high society women sporting his designs.

In 1997, Saab was the first non-Italian designer to become a member of the National Chamber of Italian Fashion, and in 1997 he showed his first collection outside Lebanon in Rome.

In 1998, he started his ready-to-wear line in Milan, as well as an accessories line. During the same year, Saab held a fashion show in Monaco, with Princess Stéphanie of Monaco in attendance.

In 1999, one of his dresses thickly embroidered with emeralds and diamonds was reportedly sold for $2.4 million.

Exposure internationally

Saab became more well known in the United States after he became the first Lebanese designer to dress an Oscar winner, Halle Berry, in 2002. In May 2003, the Chambre Syndicale de la Haute Couture invited him to become a member, and he showed his first haute couture collection in Paris in July 2003.

In 2003, he teamed up with Pronovias to create a bridal line, Elie by Elie Saab.

The Chambre Syndicale de la Haute Couture inducted him as a membre correspondant in 2006. His first ready-to-wear collection in Paris was the Spring-Summer 2006 collection.

Saab, Tina Knowles, House of Deréon, Giorgio Armani, Versace, and Herve Leger served as the designers for the outfits of the 2007 The Beyoncé Experience tour. In 2010, Saab dressed 102 celebrities for events overall, up from 40 in 2009. That year, he  signed a 10-year licensing agreement with Beauté Prestige International for fragrance and cosmetics. The figure for 2011, up until March, was 88. In 2011, Madame Tussauds unveiled a wax statue of Kate Winslet draped in the Elie Saab dress she wore at 63rd Primetime Emmy Awards. In 2011, Elie Saab launched his first fragrance Le Parfum.

The Duchess of Cambridge wore an Elie Saab gown while attending Royal Ascot in 2019. This was the first time one of Saab's gowns was worn by a British royal.

Recent dresses and collaborations
In 2012, he worked with the Lebanese American University and London College of Fashion to launch a bachelor’s degree in fashion design. As of 2013, the brand had boutiques located in Beirut, Dubai, Doha, Paris, London, Geneva, Hong Kong, Moscow, New York City, and Mexico, with 100 retail outlets total. Saab's son, Elie Saab Jr, became brand director in 2013.

Saab appeared as a judge on Project Runway: Middle East in 2016. Between 2015 and 2017, the Elie Saab company opened a second Paris boutique and a new location in London's Mayfair, and in Manhattan. The Manhattan store that opened in October 2016 was his first in the country. As of March 2017, his couture collections are available in Paris, London, and Beirut, while his ready-to-wear clothes were in 160 retailers and his own boutiques. Also that month, the Elie Saab company opened a new Madison Avenue store.

Elie Saab X Emaar 
The Lebanese fashion designer and the real estate development company Emaar reveal luxurious Elie Saab at Emaar Beachfront property in Dubai. The luxurious gated island property, Grand Bleu Tower at Emaar Beachfront, will include one, two and three-bedroom apartments as well as four-bedroom penthouses with interiors by Elie Saab. The residential tower boasts views of the Arabian Sea, The Palm and Dubai Marina.

Beirut explosion, 4 August 2020 
Saab's main office and headquarters were left badly damaged by the explosion, his home nearby was completely destroyed.

Despite this thought, the designer and his team plan to get back to work in order to finish the collection for the September show.

In April 2021, Elie Saab launched an initiative that consists in donating a portion of sales to UNICEF’s “Integrated Education and Well-Being for Vulnerable Girls in Lebanon Program.”

Notable clients and projects

He has been worn by Queen Rania of Jordan, Victoria, Crown Princess of Sweden, Princess Madeleine of Sweden, Princess Maria-Olympia of Greece and Stéphanie, Hereditary Grand Duchess of Luxembourg. In 1999, Queen Rania of Jordan wore Elie Saab for her enthronement. Countess Stéphanie and the Hereditary Grand Duke married in a civil ceremony married in 2012, where the bride wore a dress designed by Elie Saab. Princess Claire of Luxembourg also wore an Saab-designed dress on her wedding. First Lady of France Brigitte Macron wore an Elie Saab outfit of military coat and skinny trousers during a state visit to China.

Halle Berry wore a burgundy gown by Saab to the 2002 Academy Awards when she won for Best Actress. In a poll by Debenhams published in The Daily Telegraph the dress was voted the 8th greatest red carpet gown of all time. Cosmopolitan magazine cited the dress as "one of the Best Oscar dresses of all time". Berry later wore another dress by Saab to the 2003 Oscars.

Sandra Bullock wore Elie Saab at the 85th Academy Awards in 2013 and at the world premiere of the movie Ocean's 8 in New York.

In 2018, Rose Leslie wore a floral embroidered Elie Saab wedding dress when she wed her Game of Thrones co-star Kit Harington.

Other notable clients of Saab's work have included Nicole Kidman, Eva Green, Beyoncé, Aishwarya Rai, Anna Kendrick, Christina Aguilera, Catherine Zeta-Jones, Angelina Jolie, Celine Dion, Elena Anaya, Elsa Zylberstein, Heidi Klum, Karlie Kloss, Dame Helen Mirren, Emilia Clarke, Priyanka Chopra, Sonam Kapoor, Kendall Jenner, Taylor Swift, and Tiffany Trump.

Personal life
Saab and his wife Claudine live with their family in Lebanon, and together have three sons.

Controversies
In January 2018, Saab received backlash on social media after his label's Instagram account posted a picture of Israeli actress Gal Gadot wearing one of his dresses to the National Board of Review awards with the caption "A flawless Gal Gadot in Elie Saab Ready-to-Wear Spring Summer 2018 at the national board of review annual gala in New York". The post was later deleted.

Filmography
2016: Project Runway: Middle East - judge

References

External links

Living people
1964 births
Lebanese fashion designers
Wedding dress designers
Lebanese businesspeople in fashion
Lebanese brands
Artists from Beirut
Lebanese Maronites
Arab Christians